Trance Zomba is the second album by Argentine rock group Babasónicos.

Track listing
 "Desarmate" (Disarm Yourself)
 "Malón" (Indian Raid)
 "Montañas de Agua" (Mountains of Water)
 "Coralcaraza" 
 "Ascendiendo" (Ascending)
 "Patinador Sagrado" (Holy Roller)
 "Koyote" 
 "Poder Ñandú" (Rhea Power)
 "Árbol Palmera" (Palm Tree)
 "Sheeba Baby" 
 "Misericordia" (Mercy)
 "Posesión del Tercer Tipo" (Possession of the Third Kind)

References

1994 albums
Babasónicos albums